The 1966 Soviet Chess Championship was the 34th edition of USSR Chess Championship. Held from 28 December 1966 to 2 February 1967 in Tbilisi. The tournament was won by Leonid Stein. The final were preceded by semifinals events at Irkutsk, Krasnodar and Oryol.

Table and results

References 

USSR Chess Championships
Championship
Chess
1966 in chess
Chess